Dr. K. S. Narayan Reddy M.D., D.C.P., Ph.D., F.A.M.S., F.I.M.S.A., F.A.F.Sc., F.I.A.M.S., F.A.F.M. (17 July 1930 – 9 April 2021) was an Indian professor of Forensic Medicine.

He retired as Principal at Osmania Medical College, Hyderabad and was Honorary Professor of Forensic Medicine at S.V.S. Medical College, Mahaboobnagar, Andhra Pradesh. He was awarded the degree of Doctor of Philosophy in Medicine, by the International University of Contemporary Studies, Washington D.C., U.S.A. in 1998. He was well known to the medical students in India through his Textbook of Forensic Medicine and Toxicology for more than 40 years. He has been awarded the highest award in Medical science Dr. B. C. Roy Award for the development of medical specialities in 1986.
He contributed to a great number of forensic cases all over India . 

He has contributed 31 articles to Professional journals and published 10 books in Forensic Medicine. His first book that has been the Textbook for Medical Students is The Essentials of Forensic Medicine and Toxicology ran into 34 editions till 2017.

Scientific contributions
 The Essentials of Forensic Medicine and Toxicology 
 The Synopsis of Forensic Medicine and Toxicology 
 Concise Forensic Medicine and Toxicology.
 Medicolegal Manual

Awards
 Dr. B. C. Roy Award in the category of development of medical specialities (1986)

References

Indian forensic scientists
Textbook writers
Dr. B. C. Roy Award winners
1930 births
2021 deaths